Tory Creek may refer to:

Tory Creek (Missouri), a stream in Missouri
Tory Creek (Virginia), a stream in Virginia